Oligodon perkinsi, also known as Perkin's short-headed snake, is a species of snake of the family Colubridae.

The snake is endemic to the Philippines, where it is known to live on the islands of Culion, Palawan, Calauit and Busuanga.

References 

perkinsi
Snakes of Southeast Asia
Reptiles of the Philippines
Endemic fauna of the Philippines
Reptiles described in 1925
Taxa named by Edward Harrison Taylor